Adam is a 2019 American comedy film directed by Rhys Ernst, from a screenplay by Ariel Schrag, based upon the novel of the same name by Schrag. It stars Nicholas Alexander, Bobbi Menuez, Leo Sheng, Chloe Levine, and Margaret Qualley.

It had its world premiere at the Sundance Film Festival on January 25, 2019. It was released on August 14, 2019, by Wolfe Releasing.

Plot
Shy and nerdy teenager Adam (Nicholas Alexander) spends his last high school summer in NYC with his older sister, who is part of the local lesbian and trans activist scene. Adam meets and develops a crush on a lesbian girl, Gillian (Bobbi Menuez), at an LGBTQ+ party. Gillian assumes that he is a trans man, and Adam confirms the lie, running with the deception in order to win her affection. Adam's struggle and guilt over his deceit increases as the relationship between him and Gillian deepens, eventually leading him to admit that he is not trans. Gillian accepts both this and him, having realized that she is bisexual rather than lesbian. They break up however as the relationship was based on lies, though Adam gains a deep regard toward trans people.

Cast
 Nicholas Alexander as Adam Freeman
 Bobbi Menuez as Gillian
 Leo Sheng as Ethan
 Chloe Levine as June
 Margaret Qualley as Casey Freeman
 Jari Jones as Schuyler
 Michaela Jaé Rodriguez as Emma
 Colton Ryan as Brad
 Dana Aliya Levinson as Hazel
 Alisha B. Woods as Jackie
 Rachel Burkhardt as Nadia
 Melanie Hinkle as Kate
 Ashlie Atkinson as Bound Emcee
 Ana Gasteyer as Mom
 Yva Las Vegass as club bouncer

Production
In November 2016, it was announced Desiree Akhavan would direct the film, from a screenplay by Ariel Schrag, based upon her novel of the same name. James Schamus and Howard Gertler would produce the film, while Joe Pirro would serve as an executive producer under their Symbolic Exchange banner. However, Akhavan had to drop out of the film due to scheduling conflicts, and Rhys Ernst ended up directing the film.

Release
It had its world premiere at the Sundance Film Festival on January 25, 2019. Shortly after, Wolfe Releasing acquired distribution rights to the film. It was released on August 14, 2019.

Critical reception
The site's critical consensus reads, "Much like its well-meaning but clueless protagonist, Adam occasionally seems to be in over its head -- but its good intentions make those fumbles easier to forgive." On Metacritic, the film holds a rating of 64 out of 100, based on 10 critics, indicating "generally favorable reviews".

Controversy
Because gender deception is a major plot element of the film (and the novel upon which it is based), it has been the subject of controversy. Director Rhys Ernst, a trans person himself, has acknowledged the criticism of the source material, but says "a primary condition to my working on the project was that I would tell it from a trans perspective" and that "the changes address many of the concerns that have been raised about the novel", as well as stating "the things that people are afraid of, who haven't seen the movie, none of those things are in the movie." He also stated, "There were a lot of changes between the book and the script, so I didn't really dwell on the book that much. I'm seeing my role and vision in this to create a whole new work that's jumping off from the script but not the book so much."

Ernst also responded to online calls to boycott the film, saying, "the idea of boycotting or condemning projects before they're released is not progressive or beneficial. It reminds me of Gamergate, of attempts to shut down a female Ghostbusters movie [...] I don't think I believe in boycotts of cultural products, of art. There are other ways of engaging. I think, you know, burning a book, even the most vile book I can think of — I find that too close to fascism. I'm sorry. I don't believe in that."

References

External links
 
 
 

2019 films
2019 comedy films
2019 controversies in the United States
2019 LGBT-related films
2010s teen comedy films
American teen comedy films
American teen LGBT-related films
LGBT-related controversies in film
Films based on American novels
Films produced by James Schamus
Films set in 2006
Films set in New York City
LGBT-related comedy films
LGBT-related coming-of-age films
2010s English-language films
2010s American films
Transgender-related films